= Reichsland =

The German word Reichsland (imperial country, or reich country) can refer to several entities in German constitutional history:

- the territory of the Holy Roman Empire
- Alsace-Lorraine as part of the Reichsgebiet (German Empire) between 1871 and 1918
- a concept for Prussia in reform plans for the Weimar Republic, transforming the member state Prussia into a territory directly controlled by the federal level (Reich)
- Reichsland Saarland, the Saar territory governed by a German commissioner from 1935 to 1945
